Bryansk is a rural locality (a selo) and the administrative centre of Bryansky Selsoviet, Kizlyarsky District, Republic of Dagestan, Russia. The population was 658 as of 2010. There are 6 streets.

Geography 
Bryansk is located 277 km northeast of Kizlyar (the district's administrative centre) by road. Tushilovka and Novye Bukhty are the nearest rural localities.

Nationalities 
Russians, Avars and Dargins live there.

References 

Rural localities in Kizlyarsky District